The 2019 Monterey Grand Prix was a sports car race sanctioned by the International Motor Sports Association (IMSA). The race was held at WeatherTech Raceway Laguna Seca in Monterey County, California, on September 15, 2019. This race was the eleventh round of the 2019 WeatherTech SportsCar Championship, and the seventh round of the WeatherTech Sprint Cup.

Background 
On September 6, 2019, IMSA released a technical bulletin regarding the Balance of Performance for the race. In the Daytona Prototype International (DPi) class, the Mazda RT24-P was given a 5-kilogram weight increase. The Cadillac DPI-V.R was made 20 kilograms lighter, as well as a 0.3-millimeter larger air restrictor, and a fuel capacity increase of 2 liters. No changes were made GTLM. In GTD, the Porsche 911 GT3 R and Lexus RC F GT3 were made  20 and 5 kilograms heavier, respectively. The Lamborghini Huracán GT3 Evo and McLaren 720S GT3 were made 10 kilograms lighter.

Entries 

On September 4, 2019, the entry list for the event was released, featuring 32 cars. There were 10 cars in Daytona Prototype International, 2 entries in LMP2, 8 entries in GTLM, and 12 entries in GTD. Dalton Kellett returned to PR1 Mathiasen Motorsports after James French competed at Road America. In GTD, Lone Star Racing would not return for Laguna Seca. Christina Nielsen returned to the #57 Meyer Shank Racing entry after being substituted by Bia Figueiredo and Alice Powell in the 2 previous rounds.

Qualifying 
Ricky Taylor claimed overall pole for the event for Acura Team Penske.

Qualifying results 

  The No. 73 Park Place Motorsports entry had its two fastest laps deleted as penalty for causing a red flag during its qualifying session.

Results 

References 

Monterey Grand Prix
Monterey Grand Prix
Monterey Grand Prix